James Francis Xavier O'Brien  (born February 11, 1952) is an American basketball coach who is currently senior advisor for the Philadelphia 76ers. O'Brien was previously an assistant and head coach at both the college and NBA levels and was head coach at Wheeling Jesuit from 1982 to 1987, Dayton from 1989 to 1994, the Boston Celtics from 2001 to 2004, Philadelphia 76ers in 2004–05, and Indiana Pacers from 2007 to 2011.

Early life and education
O'Brien is the son-in-law of Hall of Fame coach Jack Ramsay. Born and raised in Philadelphia, O'Brien graduated from Roman Catholic High School of Philadelphia in 1970 and St. Joseph's University in 1974. At St. Joseph's, O'Brien started on the Hawks basketball team for three seasons. He earned an M.B.A. from the University of Maryland in 1981.

Coaching career
O'Brien was also head coach at Wheeling Jesuit University from 1982 to 1987 and the University of Dayton from 1989 to 1994. He led the Dayton Flyers to the second round of the NCAA tournament in his first season, after winning the Midwestern Collegiate Conference; however he led the Flyers to just 10 wins in his last two seasons at the school and was fired after the 1993–1994 season. O'Brien then served as an assistant coach to Rick Pitino at the University of Kentucky from 1994 to 1997 and then with the Boston Celtics from 1997 to 2001.

O'Brien was the head coach of the Boston Celtics from 2001–2004, replacing Rick Pitino. He worked to rebuild the struggling Celtics and led them twice to the playoffs. During the 2003–04 NBA season, however, O'Brien consistently fought with Celtics' general manager Danny Ainge over short-term versus long-term goals. Ainge was looking to completely redo the roster, and traded Eric Williams and Tony Battie, two of O'Brien's favorite hardworking players in December 2003. As a result of the conflict, O'Brien shocked everyone in the Celtics community by resigning in January 2004.

He was hired as head coach of the Philadelphia 76ers during the 2004–05 season. The 76ers made the playoffs in his one season as coach after missing the postseason the previous year, and although O'Brien had a multiyear contract, he was fired. Billy King hired Maurice Cheeks as head coach after Cheeks was fired by the Portland Trail Blazers.

The Indianapolis Star reported on May 31, 2007, that he would coach the Indiana Pacers. He replaced Rick Carlisle, who was fired after four years, when the team failed in 2006–07 to make the playoffs for the first time in a decade. On January 31, 2011, Pacers President of Basketball Operations Larry Bird relieved O'Brien of his coaching duties. He was replaced by assistant Frank Vogel on an interim basis, who remained as the Pacers' head coach until the 2015–16 season.

In the  season, O'Brien was an assistant coach for the Dallas Mavericks. After the season, O'Brien retired from the team to spend more time with family.

In 2016, O'Brien was hired by the Philadelphia 76ers as an assistant coach to Brett Brown.

Broadcasting career
O'Brien was also an analyst for ESPN's NBA coverage from 2005 to 2007.

Personal life

O'Brien's son, Jack O'Brien, is a noted internet comedian and podcast host.

Head coaching record

College

NBA

|-
| style="text-align:left;"|Boston
| style="text-align:left;"|
|48||24||24|||| style="text-align:center;"|5th in Atlantic||—||—||—||—
| style="text-align:center;"|Missed Playoffs
|-
| style="text-align:left;"|Boston
| style="text-align:left;"|
|82||49||33|||| style="text-align:center;"|2nd in Atlantic||16||9||7||
| style="text-align:center;"|Lost in Conf. Finals
|-
| style="text-align:left;"|Boston
| style="text-align:left;"|
|82||44||38|||| style="text-align:center;"|3rd in Atlantic||10||4||6||
| style="text-align:center;"|Lost in Conf. Semifinals
|-
| style="text-align:left;"|Boston
| style="text-align:left;"|
|46||22||24|||| style="text-align:center;"|(resigned)||—||—||—||—
| style="text-align:center;"|—
|-
| style="text-align:left;"|Philadelphia
| style="text-align:left;"|
|82||43||39|||| style="text-align:center;"|2nd in Atlantic||5||1||4||
| style="text-align:center;"|Lost in First Round
|-
| style="text-align:left;"|Indiana
| style="text-align:left;"|
|82||36||46|||| style="text-align:center;"|3rd in Central||—||—||—||—
| style="text-align:center;"|Missed Playoffs
|-
| style="text-align:left;"|Indiana
| style="text-align:left;"|
|82||36||46|||| style="text-align:center;"|4th in Central||—||—||—||—
| style="text-align:center;"|Missed Playoffs
|-
| style="text-align:left;"|Indiana
| style="text-align:left;"|
|82||32||50|||| style="text-align:center;"|4th in Central||—||—||—||—
| style="text-align:center;"|Missed Playoffs
|-
| style="text-align:left;"|Indiana
| style="text-align:left;"|
|44||17||27|||| style="text-align:center;"|(fired)||—||—||—||—
| style="text-align:center;"|—
|- class="sortbottom"
| style="text-align:left;"|Career
| ||630||303||327|||| ||31||14||17||

References

External links
 DatabaseBasketball.com: Jim O'Brien

1952 births
Living people
American men's basketball coaches
American men's basketball players
Basketball coaches from Pennsylvania
Basketball players from Philadelphia
Boston Celtics assistant coaches
Boston Celtics head coaches
Dallas Mavericks assistant coaches
Dayton Flyers men's basketball coaches
Indiana Pacers head coaches
Kentucky Wildcats men's basketball coaches
Maryland Terrapins men's basketball coaches
New York Knicks assistant coaches
Oregon Ducks men's basketball coaches
Philadelphia 76ers assistant coaches
Philadelphia 76ers head coaches
Saint Joseph's Hawks men's basketball players
UNC Pembroke Braves basketball coaches
University of Maryland, College Park alumni
Wheeling Cardinals men's basketball coaches